Chesapeake Marshlands National Wildlife Refuge Complex is a National Wildlife Refuge complex in the state of Maryland located near the Delmarva Peninsula.

Refuges within the complex
 Blackwater National Wildlife Refuge
 Eastern Neck National Wildlife Refuge
 Martin National Wildlife Refuge
 Susquehanna River National Wildlife Refuge

References
Complex website

National Wildlife Refuges in Maryland